Brillant may refer to:

People
Félix Brillant (born 1980)
Dany Brillant (born 1965)
Edmond Wilhelm Brillant (1916–2004)
Jean Brillant (1890–1918)
Pierre-Luc Brillant (born 1978)

Places
Montigné-le-Brillant, Mayenne, France
Val-Brillant, Quebec

Other
French ship Brillant (1815)
Les Brillant, a French language Canadian sitcom
Voigtländer Brillant, a twin-lens reflex camera

See also
Brilliance (disambiguation)